Thomas Barlow (1788 – 9 December 1844) was a businessman and politician active in pre-confederation New Brunswick.

External links 
Biography at the Dictionary of Canadian Biography Online

1788 births
1844 deaths
Canadian people of English descent
Members of the Legislative Assembly of New Brunswick
Politicians from Saint John, New Brunswick
Colony of New Brunswick people
Canadian merchants